Man from Kinshasa is a compilation album by the Congolese musician Tabu Ley Rochereau. It was released in 1991. Rochereau supported the album with a North American tour.

Production
The compilation's songs were taken from albums Rochereau released between 1988 and 1991. Rochereau sang in Lingala and French. Huit Kilos played guitar on the songs. Rochereau used a drum machine on some of the tracks.

Critical reception

Robert Christgau wrote: "Catchy tunes, plangent pace changes, Cuban/Ethiopian horns, musette accordion—and enough rippling guitar to keep them coming back for more." Entertainment Weekly opined that "it’s not until the chugging climax of 'Ponce-Pilate', the sixth song in, that the album at last puts across the insane happiness that marks great soukous."

The Gazette stated that "Rochereau's large Afrisa International Orchestra—16 members in all—provides a sumptuous backdrop for lively, lilting songs." The Washington Post determined that "Rochereau has a warm, sweet tenor that lends a tone of sly bemusement to his tales about gossips, seducers and beauties."

AllMusic wrote that Rochereau "dares accordion-driven soukous on one of the many highlights here, including 'Tour Eiffel'."

Track listing

References

1991 albums
Shanachie Records albums